Michael Thomas (born March 17, 1990) is an American football safety for the Cincinnati Bengals of the National Football League (NFL). He played college football at Stanford. He was signed by the San Francisco 49ers as an undrafted free agent in 2012.

Professional career

San Francisco 49ers
Thomas signed with the San Francisco 49ers as an undrafted free agent on May 4, 2012. He was waived on August 31, and was signed to the practice squad the next day. He spent the whole 2012 season on the practice squad.

On February 11, 2013, Thomas signed a reserve/future contract. On August 31, 2013, Thomas was waived by the 49ers and signed to the practice squad two days later.

Miami Dolphins
On December 10, 2013, Thomas was signed by the Miami Dolphins off the 49ers' practice squad. He made his professional debut the following week, where he recorded an interception off New England Patriots quarterback Tom Brady with two seconds left in the game to seal the Dolphins victory. He also broke up a touchdown pass intended for Danny Amendola before sealing the victory with his interception. After that game, he appeared in two more for the rest of the season.

In 2014, Thomas played in eight games with two starts before suffering a torn pectoral in Week 9. He was placed on injured reserve on November 3, 2014. He finished his second season with eighteen tackles.

Thomas became a starter for the Dolphins in 2015, starting 13 games at free safety. On December 20, 2015, he made a season-high 11 tackles against the San Diego Chargers. He finished the season with 85 tackles and two passes defended.

On September 18, 2016, Thomas recorded his first career sack and forced fumble against the New England Patriots. On December 4, he grabbed his first career fumble recovery against the Baltimore Ravens. On December 24, Thomas made a season-high eight tackles and his second career forced fumble (but the Bills recover it) against the Buffalo Bills. On December 29, Thomas was named the 2016 Good Guy Award winner, annually given "to a player for his professionalism and courtesy in assisting the media." Thomas played in all 16 games with eight starts recording 58 tackles, one sack, one pass defended, and two forced fumbles. The Dolphins finished with a record of 10-6 and made the playoffs for the first time since 2008. On January 8, 2017, Thomas in his first career playoff game recorded an interception against the Pittsburgh Steelers in the AFC Wild Card round. Along with teammate Xavien Howard, they become the first Dolphins to record interceptions in the playoffs since Calvin Jackson in 2000.

On April 17, 2017, Thomas signed his restricted free agent tender with the Dolphins. In 2017, Thomas played in 13 games with two starts before suffering a knee injury in Week 13. He made his first start of the season on November 5, replacing the injured Nate Allen. He was placed on injured reserve on December 29, 2017.

New York Giants

On March 26, 2018, Thomas signed a two-year contract with the New York Giants. Thomas had a career year with the New York Giants on defense and special teams. Thomas notched 59 total tackles, one sack, and two interceptions on defense while getting 16 of his tackles on special teams and recovering an onside kick for the Giants. He was named to the 2019 Pro Bowl as a special teams replacement for Super Bowl LIII bound Cory Littleton.

Houston Texans
On April 28, 2020, Thomas signed a one-year contract with the Houston Texans. In Week 10, Thomas suffered a season-ending torn pec and was placed on injured reserve on November 21, 2020.

Cincinnati Bengals
On October 5, 2021, Thomas was signed to the Cincinnati Bengals practice squad. He was promoted to the active roster on November 15.

Thomas re-signed with the Bengals on a one-year contract on March 17, 2022.

On March 13, 2023, Thomas re-signed with the Cincinnati Bengals on another one-year contract.

Career statistics

Personal life
In 2016, Thomas earned a Master of Business Administration degree from the University of Miami Business School.

References

External links
Miami Dolphins bio
San Francisco 49ers bio

1990 births
Living people
African-American players of American football
Players of American football from Houston
American football safeties
American football cornerbacks
Stanford Cardinal football players
San Francisco 49ers players
Miami Dolphins players
New York Giants players
Houston Texans players
Cincinnati Bengals players
University of Miami Business School alumni
21st-century African-American sportspeople
20th-century African-American people
National Conference Pro Bowl players
Ed Block Courage Award recipients